Palpita munroei is a moth in the family Crambidae. It was described by Inoue in 1996. It is found in China (Zhejiang, Fujian, Hunan, Guangdong, Guangxi, Guizhou, Yunnan, Hong Kong), Japan, Vietnam, Thailand, Borneo, Sumatra, Sulawesi, Java, the Philippines, India and Nepal.

References

Moths described in 1996
Palpita
Moths of Asia